Changxin may refer to:

 Zhang Changxin (died 1990), champion boxer in Shanghai
 ChangXin Memory Technologies, a Chinese semiconductor integrated device manufacturer

See also
 Changxing (disambiguation)
 Changting (disambiguation)